Cuthbert Quinlan Dale Collins (9 April 1897 – 3 March 1956) was an Australian journalist and author of popular fiction. He is notable for a series of sea romances written in the 1920s and 1930s, some of which were adapted for motion pictures, including Rich and Strange, directed by Alfred Hitchcock, which closely followed his novel of the same name.

Early life
He was born at Balmain, New South Wales, third son of Michael John Collins, an Irish doctor who had been a ship's surgeon in the Royal Mail Steam Packet Co., and his English wife Esther, née Copeland.

Collins's freelance career started at age 17 when his short story "The Riddle" was published in The Australasian, followed by several others until he secured a position in the newsroom of The Herald (Melbourne) in 1922.

In later life he lived in East Malvern, a suburb of Melbourne,  and had two daughters, Susan and Felicity.

Publications
Collins published 37 books, including some in the under the pen names of 'Stephen Fennimore' and 'Michael Copeland'.

Novels
 1923 Sea-tracks of the Speejacks Round the World
 1924 Ordeal
 1925 The Haven:A Chronicle
 1927 The Sentimentalists (reprinted as Sal of Singapore, translated into German)
 1928 Vanity Under the Sun
 1929 The Idolaters
 1930 Rich and Strange
 1932 Jungle Maid
 1934 Vulnerable: A Tale with Cards
 1936 Race the Sun
 1947 Bright Vista
 1949 Bush Holiday (as Stephen Fennimore)
 1950 Bush Voyage
 1951 Victoria's My Home Ground
 1959 Anzac Adventure: The Story of Gallipoli Told for Young Readers

Short stories
 1914 The Riddle. The Australasian
 1919 The Paper Soldier. The Weekly Times, 19 July 1919

Filmography
 Sal of Singapore (1928)
 The Ship from Shanghai (1930)
 His Woman (1931)
 Rich and Strange (1931) (titled East of Shanghai in the United States)

References

External links

20th-century Australian novelists
1897 births
1956 deaths
Australian male novelists
20th-century Australian male writers